The North Pole (also known as the "Geographic North Pole" or "Terrestrial North Pole") is the point in the Northern Hemisphere where the Earth's axis of rotation meets its surface.

North Pole may also refer to:

Terrestrial, celestial and planetary North Poles
 North magnetic pole, the shifting point on the Earth's surface where the Earth's magnetic field points directly downwards
 , the point of intersection of the Earth's surface with the axis of a simple magnetic dipole that best approximates the Earth's actual more complex magnetic field
 Northern pole of inaccessibility, the point in the Arctic Ocean farthest from land
 North celestial pole, an imaginary point in the northern sky towards which the Earth's axis of rotation points

Cities, towns, villages
 North Pole, Alaska
 North Pole, New York
 A locality in Marble Bar, Western Australia

Other uses 
 One end of a magnetic dipole; see Magnetism
 Northpole (film), a 2014 television film about Christmas
 North Pole depot, a train maintenance depot in London 
 North Pole Stream, New Brunswick, Canada
 North Pole drift ice station, in the Arctic Ocean, including a list of stations
 Northpole, a video series produced and directed by Peter North

See also 
 North Poole (disambiguation)